Theldor Airfield was a temporary World War II airfield located approximately  north-northeast of Vinita, Oklahoma.  It was closed after World War II.

History
Theldor airfield provided contract glider training to the United States Army Air Forces from 1942 to 1944. Training was provided by Burke Aviation Service using an all-way turf airfield and, primarily, C-47 Skytrains and Waco CG-4 unpowered Gliders. The mission of the school was to train glider pilot students to proficiency in operation of gliders in various types of towed and soaring flight, both day and night, as well as in servicing of gliders in the field.

It was inactivated during 1944 with the drawdown of AAFTC's pilot training program. No evidence remains of its existence.

See also

 Oklahoma World War II Army Airfields
 31st Flying Training Wing (World War II)

References

 Manning, Thomas A. (2005), History of Air Education and Training Command, 1942–2002.  Office of History and Research, Headquarters, AETC, Randolph AFB, Texas 
 Shaw, Frederick J. (2004), Locating Air Force Base Sites, History’s Legacy, Air Force History and Museums Program, United States Air Force, Washington DC. 

1942 establishments in Oklahoma
USAAF Glider Training Airfields
USAAF Contract Flying School Airfields
Airfields of the United States Army Air Forces in Oklahoma
Buildings and structures in Craig County, Oklahoma